Mark Pearn (born 21 March 1977 in Bristol, England) is a male retired English field hockey player.

Hockey career
Pearn was a member of the England and Great Britain squads, making his debut for England against the Netherlands in the 1995 Champions Trophy in Berlin. He scored his first international goal against India in the tournament to become the youngest player to score for England at just 18 years old.

He participated in two Summer Olympics in 2000 and 2004, as well as in the 1998 Men's Hockey World Cup, the 2002 Men's Hockey World Cup, the 1998 Commonwealth Games and the 2002 Commonwealth Games.

Pearn was voted UK Player of the Year by members of the Hockey Writers' Club twice, in 2000 and 2011.

He initially retired in 2005 but returned to international hockey in 2011 at the age of 34 to challenge for a place in the 2012 London Olympic Games. Having played in the 2011 London Cup, the 2011 European Championship, 2011 Champions Trophy and 2012 London Olympics Test Event, he was not selected for the final Olympic squad and retired for the second time in 2012.

Pearn has played club hockey for Stroud, Gloucester City, Reading, Real Club de Polo de Barcelona , East Grinstead (player/coach) and Richmond (player/assistant coach).

Pearn signed as the Head Coach of Surbiton men's first team in May 2016.

References

External links

 

1977 births
Living people
English male field hockey players
English field hockey coaches
Male field hockey midfielders
Male field hockey forwards
Olympic field hockey players of Great Britain
British male field hockey players
Field hockey players at the 2000 Summer Olympics
1998 Men's Hockey World Cup players
Field hockey players at the 2004 Summer Olympics
2002 Men's Hockey World Cup players
Sportspeople from Bristol
Commonwealth Games bronze medallists for England
Commonwealth Games medallists in field hockey
Reading Hockey Club players
East Grinstead Hockey Club players
Real Club de Polo de Barcelona players
English expatriate sportspeople in Spain
Expatriate field hockey players
Surbiton Hockey Club players
Field hockey players at the 1998 Commonwealth Games
Medallists at the 1998 Commonwealth Games